The 1998 Mosport Festival was a multi-class sports car and GT motor race held at Mosport International Raceway in Bowmanville, Ontario, Canada on August 9, 1998. It was the fifth round of the 1998 Professional SportsCar Racing Championship season. The race was held over a two-hour-and-45-minute time period, during which 128 laps of the 3.9-kilometre circuit were completed for a race distance of 506.544 kilometres.

The race was won by the Dyson Racing team with drivers Butch Leitzinger and James Weaver driving a Riley & Scott Mk III-Ford.  It was the 13th and final IMSA GT Championship race held at Mosport, with the championship being replaced by the American Le Mans Series in 1999.

Race results
Class winners in bold.

References

Mosport
Grand Prix of Mosport
Mosport
sports